The Isle of Wight Festival 2007 was the sixth revived Isle of Wight Festival on the Seaclose Park site in Newport on the Isle of Wight. It took place between 8–10 June 2007. Tickets went on sale at 9am on Thursday 22 February and were sold out by Monday 26 February. It was the first festival since 2003 with no official sponsor.

The festival capacity was around 60,000. Local artist, Helen Davenport, created a  illuminated wicker and tissue paper statue to commemorate the performance of Jimi Hendrix at the 1970 festival. The campsite was located next to the site on an extensive farmland site. The Seaclose Park site was within ten minutes' walking distance of the town of Newport.

The 2007 Festival sold out in a record time of less than five days. The festival was The Rolling Stones' first British festival performance for over thirty years since their performance at the 1976 Knebworth fair. The festival once again featured the popular Carling warm beer amnesty, in which people could trade warm beer for cold cans of Carling.

The Red Arrows performed a full-smoke aerial display during the festival weekend.

The festival won the "Best Major Festival" award at the 2007 UK Festival Awards in London in November 2007. This beat off stiff competition from Glastonbury Festival, T in the Park and Reading and Leeds Festivals. This success was followed by promoter, John Giddings, winning the "Outstanding Contribution to UK Festivals" award. In reaction to this, Glastonbury organiser, Michael Eavis, offered to present Giddings with the award personally.

Highlights 
 Part of the stage moved forward during a performance by The Rolling Stones.
 The Rolling Stones were joined on stage by Paolo Nutini and Amy Winehouse.
 The Feeling performing an energetic cover of The Buggles Video Killed the Radio Star to the delight of the crowd.
 Mick Jagger quipped whilst interacting with the crowd that the festival was somewhat of a non event. Stating 'the water costs two quid, the burgers four, and a dog ate my dope'.
 There were pyrotechnic displays during the performance of Muse, particularly during the final song Take A Bow.
 Snow Patrol lead singer, Gary Lightbody interacted with spectators outside the festival site on the opposite bank of the River Medina, which resulted in 'tongue-in-cheek' boos from the paying crowd.
 Country Joe McDonald managed to get the crowd chanting the profanity 'fuck' for a minute.
 The crowd continuing the chant of L.S.F. after Kasabian's set had finished.
 A full Red Arrows aerial display performed on the Saturday afternoon crowd members speculated was better than some acts.

Line Up

Main stage

Friday
 Snow Patrol
 Groove Armada as special guest.
 The Feeling
 Echo & the Bunnymen
 Koopa

Saturday
 Muse
 Kasabian as special guest.
 Ash
 Wolfmother
 Amy Winehouse
 Donovan
 Arno Carstens
 Carbon/Silicon
 The Thirst
 The Menschen

Sunday
 The Rolling Stones
 Keane as special guest.
 The Fratellis
 Paolo Nutini
 James Morrison
 Melanie C
 Country Joe McDonald
 The Hedrons
 Siniez

Strongbow Rooms

Strongbow Rooms is a tent and live music venue which tours many of the festivals in the United Kingdom. It made an appearance at the Isle Of Wight Festival with acts such as Annie Mac, Krafty Kuts and Shitdisco.

The Hipshaker Lounge

The popular Hipshaker Dance Lounge was open on the Thursday 7 June to entertain early camping ticket holders. It featured acts such as The Bees (band) & The Sails  and two tribute bands of The Who and The Beatles respectively.

Bacardi B Live

The Bacardi B-Live opened to campers on Thursday 7 June providing music and refreshments. It featured acts such as DJ Norman Jay.

Features 

The Strawberry Fields area contained amongst others, the following attractions and features –
 The Strongbow Ciderhouse
 The Hipshaker Lounge
 Bacardi B-Live
 The Pussy Parlour
 The Bandstand
 The Kids Zone
 Babylon Bar
 The Zebra Champagne Bar

Other attractions included –
 Carling Cold Beer Amnesty
 The 'Solace' Tea And Cake Free Refreshment Tent
 A Funfair
 A Women's Institute Refreshment Tent

Controversy

Pre festival controversy

There was some debate amongst the Isle of Wight Council members about whether to grant the Festival a licence, due to the numerous complaints and objections from local residents, mainly those living in Fairlee Road. Ultimately the Council approved the Festival to a maximum of 60,000 attendees. The Festival's future also came under considerable jeopardy as the Isle of Wight Council tried to enforce the Isle of Wight Act 1970, resulting in a £500,000 penalty on the organisers, Solo. The penalty was reduced however, and John Giddings stated that if the Island residents and councillors continued to create such problems for Solo, then the future of the Festival on the Island would be in doubt. John Giddings initially refused to issue Fairlee Road residents with complimentary weekend tickets, as he had done in previous years; perhaps due to the afore-mentioned objections. However, in May he granted free tickets to the residents, many of whom had already bought tickets, thus ending a controversial debate.

There was also some debate as to whether the RMT would grant a general strike on the Island over the Festival weekend. This would have rendered the Island's bus network virtually obsolete and would have left Festival-goers with logistical problems. Thankfully, however, the strike was cancelled and Southern Vectis bus services operated as normal.

Organisers Solo, were accused of being ticket touts by the Island residents as the organisers auctioned 100 tickets to the highest bidder on eBay. Giddings replied to the statement claiming 'I have the right to do what I like, because its my festival'. He also suggested that if people were against this policy then they should simply not buy tickets in this way. The notion of the organisers being touts represents a simplified accusation by those who made the claim..

Post festival controversy

Many of the site security team have been both accused of being heavy-handed and ineffective, to the point where one festival attendee was physically assaulted by security resulting in a broken leg. There are claims of ejection from site without due reason by some festival goers. Others claim that security were not present during incidences where they would have been able to assist, particularly in campsite disturbances and theft.

References

External links 

Isle of Wight Festival
Isle of Wight Festival MySpace Site
Festival organisers Solo homepage
Strongbow Rooms Official MySpace Site
Virtual Festivals Review

2007
2007 in British music
2007 in England
21st century on the Isle of Wight